Future SC is a Cayman Islander football club, which currently plays in Cayman Islands' Premier League.

Current roster

External links
 caymanactive.com
 caribbeanfootballdatabase.com

Football clubs in the Cayman Islands
Association football clubs established in 1998
1998 establishments in the Cayman Islands